Tessa Morris-Suzuki (born 29 October 1951 in England), born as Tessa Morris, is a historian of modern Japan and North Korea. She is Professor in the School of Culture, History and Language, College of Asia and the Pacific, the Australian National University. She is also a coordinator of an open access journal AsiaRights, and has served as president of the Asian Studies Association of Australia. She was the winner of the Academic Prize of the Fukuoka Asian Culture Prize in 2013.

Early life

Born in England, she obtained her B.A. in Russian history in University of Bristol, M.A. and Ph.D. in Economic history of Japan in University of Bath. She lived and worked in Japan before emigrating to Australia in 1981. Tessa Morris married to the Japanese writer Hiroshi Suzuki and incorporated her husband's surname into her double surname. In turn, her husband incorporated her surname into his pen name as Morisu Hiroshi.

Academic career
Her research focuses on Japan's frontiers and minority communities and on questions of historical memory in East Asia. She is the author of Exodus to North Korea: Shadows from Japan's Cold War. Her two most recent books are To the Diamond Mountains: A Hundred Year Journey Through China and Korea, and Borderline Japan: Foreigners and Frontier Controls in the Post-war Era (both 2010).

Awards and honors
In 2012, she was awarded an Australian Laureate Fellowship.

Publications
Tennô to Amerika (The Emperor and America, coauthored), Shûeisha, 2010
Borderline Japan: Foreigners and Frontier Controls in the Postwar Era, Cambridge University Press, 2010
To the Diamond Mountains: A Hundred Year Journey Through China and Korea, Rowman and Littlefield, 2010
Beyond Computopia: Information, Automation and Democracy in Japan, Kegan Paul International, 1988.
The Technological Transformation of Japan, Cambridge University Press, 1994. (also published in Chinese and Korean translations)
Re-Inventing Japan: Time Space, Nation, M. E. Sharpe, 1998. (also published in Spanish translation)
Demokurashii no Bôken (Ventures in Democracy, co-authored), Shûeisha, 2004.
The Past Within Us: Media, Memory, History, Verso, 2005. (also published in Japanese translation)
Exodus to North Korea: Shadows from Japan's Cold War, Rowman and Littlefield, 2007. (also published in Japanese translation)

References

External links

1951 births
Living people
Academic staff of the Australian National University
Historians of Japan
English historians
Australian women academics
British emigrants to Australia